A close-bodied gown, English nightgown, or robe à l'anglaise was a women's fashion of the 18th century. Like the earlier mantua, from which it evolved, the back of the gown featured pleats from the shoulder, stitched down to mould the gown closely to the body until the fullness was released into the skirt. Through the 1770s, the back pleats became narrower and closer to the center back, and by the 1780s these pleats had mostly disappeared and the skirt and bodice were cut separately. The gown was open in front, to reveal a matching or contrasting petticoat, and featured elbow-length sleeves, which were finished with separate frills called engageantes.

Gallery

See also
 1700–1750 in fashion
 1750–1795 in fashion

Notes

References

Ribeiro, Aileen: The Art of Dress: Fashion in  England and France 1750–1820, Yale University Press, 1995, 
Freshman, Philip, Dorothy J. Schuler, and Barbara Einzig, eds (1983). An Elegant Art: Fashion & Fantasy in the Eighteenth Century, Abrams/Los Angeles County Museum of Art,  
Takeda, Sharon Sadako, and Kaye Durland Spilker (2010). Fashioning Fashion: European Dress in Detail, 1700 - 1915, LACMA/Prestel USA, 
Waugh, Norah, The Cut of Women's Clothes: 1600-1930, New York, Routledge, 1968, 

Gowns
Fashion
History of clothing (Western fashion)